Johan Henri Antoine Gerrit Schmitt (August 31, 1881 in Vrijenban, Delft – August 12, 1955 in Amsterdam) was a Dutch gymnast who competed in the 1908 Summer Olympics. He was part of the Dutch gymnastics team, which finished seventh in the team event.

References

External links
 

1881 births
1955 deaths
Dutch male artistic gymnasts
Gymnasts at the 1908 Summer Olympics
Olympic gymnasts of the Netherlands
Sportspeople from Delft